The Women's National League Cup is an annual English football cup competition, founded in 1991 by the Women's Football Association (WFA). It was renamed the FA Women's Premier League Cup from 1994 to 2018. 

The first edition of the Cup included clubs from the 1991–92 WFA National League Premier Division and the winners were the second-tier Arsenal, who beat Millwall 1–0 with a goal by Naz Ball. The Football Association assumed the running of the competition in 1994–95.

Clubs from league levels 1 and 2 competed in the Women's Premier League Cup tournament annually until 2009–10, with Arsenal the most frequent winners, in ten seasons. From 2011 onwards, the top-league teams played in the FA WSL's League Cup instead. Since 2011, the most successful clubs in the Premier/National League Cup have been Tottenham and Blackburn with two final victories each.

The current Women's National League Cup is open to the 72 teams in the FA Women's National League – Northern and Southern divisions, plus the four regional Division One leagues. It is the women's football equivalent to the men's EFL Trophy of third- and fourth-tier teams, although the competitions are organised by different governing bodies.

Format
The competitions format has changed having previously also included a preceding group stage prior to the knockout rounds.

After the league restructuring of the Women's Premier League in 2015 up to 72 teams are eligible to participate. At first all teams are drawn against each other in the determining round. The winning teams then are drawn into either a preliminary round or directly into the first round of the cup. Thus 32 teams then play the first round.

The losers of the determining round play a preliminary round and then a round of 32 onwards for the FA Women's National League Plate, first played out in 2015–16.

1993 Wembley final

The 1992–93 competition ended with a final at Wembley Stadium. Before a sparse crowd, Arsenal beat Knowsley United 3–0 to retain the trophy.

This was one of very few competitive women's club games known to have been held at the old Wembley Stadium; it also remains the only women's League Cup final to be played at Wembley.

The match was held prior to the 1993 Football League Third Division play-off Final. Arsenal manager Vic Akers recalled that the women's teams were not given use of the main dressing rooms.

List of seasons and finals
Level 1 and 2 league cup competition: 

Level 2 and 3 cup competition:

Level 3 and 4 cup competition (Women's Premier League Cup, renamed National League Cup in 2018–19):

Performance by club

See also 
 FA Women's National League Plate
 FA Women's National League
 Women's FA Cup

References

External links
 Official Site – TheFA.com
Results 2014/15

 
National association football league cups
Cup
Women's football competitions in England
Recurring sporting events established in 1991
1991 establishments in England